In the run-up to the April 2019 Israeli legislative election, which was held on 9 April, various organisations carried out opinion polling to gauge voting intentions in Israel. Results of such polls are displayed in this article, ranging from the previous legislative election, held on 17 March 2015, to the 2019 election.

Campaign period

Electoral threshold 
Polls do not take the electoral threshold (currently 3.25%) into account in a uniform fashion. Some polls reported the number of seats each party would win purely according to the percentages, as though there were no threshold; others eliminated parties that polled below the threshold and distributed the 120 available Knesset seats only among those who passed it. As a result, parties that polled at or near the threshold can show inconsistent results, bouncing between 0 and the minimum 3 or 4 seats. Polls may not add up to 120 seats due to rounding or omitted parties that drop out or do not poll consistently.

Graphs 
These graphs show the polling trends from the time Knesset candidate lists were finalized on 21 February, until the day of the election. No polls were published from Friday before the election until the election date.

If more than one poll was conducted on the same day, the graphs show the average of the polls for that date.

Blocs 

Legend
 Right-of-centre parties: all current government parties—Likud, Kulanu, Shas, United Torah Judaism (UTJ), Union of the Right-Wing Parties (URWP), and New Right—as well as Yisrael Beiteinu and Zehut.
 Centre and left-of-centre parties: Labor, Blue & White, Ra'am-Balad, Hadash-Ta'al, Meretz, and Gesher.

Note: Political blocs do not necessarily determine the exact makeup of post-election coalitions.

Parties

Polls 
Poll results are listed in the table below in reverse chronological order, showing the most recent first. The highest figure in each survey is displayed in bold, and the background shaded in the leading party's colour. In the instance that there is a tie, then both figures are shaded. Parties that fall below the threshold are denoted by the percentage of votes that they received (N%) instead of the seats they would have gotten. When a poll has no information on a certain party, that party is instead marked by a dash (–).

These tables list the polls published from the time that Yisrael Beiteinu left the government coalition in mid-November 2018, until election day.

Legend
 R — sum of right-of-centre parties, including all current government parties—Likud, Kulanu, Shas, United Torah Judaism (UTJ), Union of the Right-Wing Parties (URWP), and New Right—as well as Yisrael Beiteinu and Zehut.
 L — sum of centre and left-of-centre parties, including: Labor, Blue & White, Ra'am-Balad, Hadash-Ta'al, Meretz, and Gesher.

Note: Political blocs do not necessarily determine the exact makeup of post-election coalitions.

Student polls 
This table lists polls answered by Israeli college and university students.

20th Knesset 

This table lists the polls published from the beginning of the 20th Knesset to the time that Yisrael Beiteinu left the government coalition in mid-November 2018.

Legend
 C — sum of 2015 government coalition parties, including: Likud, Kulanu, The Jewish Home, Shas, United Torah Judaism, and Yisrael Beiteinu (joined in 2016).
 O — sum of opposition parties, including: Zionist Union (Labor Party and Hatnuah), Yesh Atid, Joint List and Meretz, as well as independent MK Orly Levy who resigned from Yisrael Beiteinu in 2016.

Scenario polls

If Netanyahu is indicted

Mergers 
Multiple polls were published about hypothetical mergers, some of which eventually materialized during the pre-campaign, such as Gantz, Ya'alon, Ashkenazi and Lapid (Blue and White), or Jewish Home, Tkuma and Otzma Yehudit (Union of the Right-Wing Parties).

Likud and Yisrael Beiteinu

Hosen with Telem (Moshe Ya'alon)

Hosen with Hatnuah (Tzipi Livni)

Hosen with Yesh Atid (Yair Lapid)

Hosen with the Zionist Union

Hosen with Yesh Atid and Labor

Hosen with Yesh Atid and Gabi Ashkenazi

Hosen with Yesh Atid, Labor, Telem, Hatnua, Ashkenazi, Barak

Hosen with Kulanu and Gabi Ashkenazi

Union of right-wing parties

Haredim

Yesh Atid and Hatnuah

Labor and Meretz

Multiple mergers Labor and Meretz, Hosen with Yesh Atid and Gabi Ashkenazi, Jewish Home and Tkuma

Preferred Prime Minister polls 
Some opinion pollsters have asked voters which party leader they would prefer as Prime Minister. Their responses are given as percentages in the tables below.

Notes

References 

Opinion polling in Israel